This list of castles in Africa includes castles, forts, and mock castles in Africa.

Angola
Fortaleza de São Miguel (1641–1648)
Fort Naulila, Cunene Province
Fort Cuangar, Cunene Province

Egypt

 Buhen (c. 1860 BCE)
 Cairo Citadel (12th century)
 Citadel of Qaitbay (15th century)

Ethiopia

 Fasil Ghebbi, Gondar (17th century)

Gambia
Fort James (1651)
Fort Jillifree, Jufureh

Ghana

 Cape Coast Castle, Cape Coast (1688–1782, April 1659 – May 1659)
 Elmina Castle, Elmina (1482)
 English Fort (Fort Vrendenburg), Komenda (1785–1871)
 Fort Amsterdam, Abandze, Cormantin (1665–1721, 1785–1867)
 Fort Apollonia, Beyin (16??–16??, 1868–1871)
 Fort Batenstein, Butri (1656–1665, 1666–1871)
 Fort Crêvecoeur, Accra (1649–1782, 1785–1867/8)
 Fort Dorothea, Akwida (1687–1698, 1711–1712, 1732–1804)
 Fort Good Hope (Fort Goedehoop), Senya Beraku (1667/1705–1782, 1785–1868)
 Fort Hollandia (1725–1815, previously Gross-Friedrichsburg, part of the former Brandenburger Gold Coast settlements), sold to the Dutch by Prussia
 Fort Metal Cross (Metaal Kruis), Dixcove (1868–1871)
 Fort Nassau, present Moree (1598/1611–1664, 1665–1782, 1785–1867)
 Fort Oranje, Sekondi (1640–1871)
 Fort Patience (Fort Leydsaemhyt), Apam (1697–1782, 1785–1868)
 Fort Prinzenstein, Keta
 Fort Saint Antony, Axim (February 1642 – 1664, 1665–1671)
 Fort San Sebastian, Shema (1637–1664, 1664–1871)
 Fort St. Jago (Fort Conraadsburg), Elmina
 Osu Castle (Fort Christiansborg), Osu, Accra

Kenya
 Fort Jesus, Mombasa, Kenya  (1593–?)
 Thimlich Ohinga, Migori, Kenya (c. 500 – 1400)

Libya
 Cyrene Citadel
 El Tag, Kufra Oasis (mid 1930s)
 Fort Capuzzo
 Ghat Fortress
 Sabha Citadel
 Saraya El Hamra, Tripoli

Madagascar
Fort Flacourt, Tolanaro (1643)
Fort lalana Sylvain Roux, Île Sainte-Marie (1753)
Fort Rova, Majunga (1824)
Fort Voyron, Antananarivo (1940–1945)
Windsor Castle, Antsiranana (1940–1945)

Mozambique
Fort São Caetano, Sofala (1505)
São Sebastião (1558–1608)

Nigeria
Kajuru Castle, Kajuru, Nigeria (1981–1989)

Senegal
 Fort Nassau 
 Fort Oranje

Sierra Leone 

 Fort Bunce (1670–1840)
 Fort Lomboko (before 1839–1849)
 Fort Tasso (1160–?)
 Fort Thornton (1792)
 Fort York (after 1672 – around 1729)
 unnamed fort close to Tanguarim (15th century)

Somalia 

 Castle town of Qandala, Bari, Puntland (no longer existent)
 Citadel ruins of Gondershe, Banaadir, Somalia
 Dhulbahante Garesa, Eyl, Puntland
 Dhulbahante Garesa, Taleh, Sool, Somaliland

South Africa

 Castle Kyalami, Gauteng (1990s)
 Castle of Good Hope, Cape Town (1666)
 Castle on the Cliff, Western Cape (1960s)
 Craighross Castle, Noetzie, Western Cape
 Fort Beaufort, Eastern Cape (1822–1837)
 Fort Durnford, Estcourt, KwaZulu-Natal (1847)
 Fort Hare, Alice, Eastern Cape (19th century)
 Fort Mistake, Glencoe, KwaZulu-Natal
 Greylingstad, Mpumalanga (c. 1900)
 Knoetzie Castles, Western Cape (1930s)
 Lindsay Castle, Noetzie, Western Cape
 Voortrekker Fort, Ohrigstad, Mpumalanga

Sudan
 Semna West Fort, Semna (Nubia), (1965–1920 BCE)

Tanzania
Bagamoyo Fort, Bagamoyo (c. 1860 German colonial fortified building)
Ikoma Fort, Serengeti National Park (19th century German colonial fort)
Ngome Kongwe (Old Fort), Stone Town, Zanzibar (c. 1700)
Old Portuguese fort, Kilwa Kisiwani (c. 1500)

Tunisia
Borj El Kebir, Djerba island (14th century)
Borj El Kebir (Mahdia), Mahdia Governorate (16th century)
Kasbah of Le Kef, Kef Governorate, (c. 1612)
Kasbah of Sfax (9th-century)
Kelibia Fort, Kelibia (5th century bc, 16th century)
Ribat of Monastir, Monastir (c. 796)
Ribat of Sousse, Sousse (c. 812)

Zambia
Lundazi Castle, Eastern Province

Zimbabwe
Fort Victoria, Masvingo
Great Zimbabwe (11th–15th century)
Nesbitt Castle, Bulawayo

References

Castles
 List|Africa